Santo "Sam" DiPietro (November 11, 1934 – October 9, 2016) was an American businessperson and politician from Maine. DiPietro, a Democrat, served on the South Portland City Council for nine years, two of which were as mayor (1986–1987). He also served four terms (8 years) in the Maine House of Representatives (1989–1996). In 1988, DiPietro defeated Republican incumbent Earl G. Nicholson to win his seat in the Legislature.

Born in Portland, Maine, DiPietro graduated from Portland High School and Northeast Business College. He owned and operated a grocery store, DiPietro's Market, in South Portland.

DiPietro died in South Portland, Maine on October 9, 2016.

References

1934 births
2016 deaths
Mayors of South Portland, Maine
Maine city council members
Democratic Party members of the Maine House of Representatives
Politicians from Portland, Maine
Businesspeople from Maine
Portland High School (Maine) alumni
20th-century American businesspeople